Kamel Arekat (also spelled Kamel Uraygat; 26 March 1901 – 17 July 1984) was a Palestinian Jordanian militant and politician who served as the Speaker of the Chamber of Deputies of Jordan. He was born in Abu Dis, a town 5km in the east of Jerusalem, to a notable Jordanian originated clan.

Early life
Kamel was born to a notable family. His grandfather, Sheikh Rashid, was known as the leader of the knights assigned by the Ottoman Sultan to protect Christian pilgrims visiting Jerusalem.
After the World War I, and the British Mandate for Palestine he served in the British Police in 1926.

Arab and Jewish conflict in Palestine 
Years later, and due to the Jewish Immigration to Palestine, he participated in the Arab-Palestinian resistance movement under the leadership of Abd al-Qadir al-Husayni.

References

1984 deaths
1901 births
Members of the House of Representatives (Jordan)
Speakers of the House of Representatives (Jordan)
People from Abu Dis